All Saints’ Church, Bow Brickhill is a Grade II* listed parish church in the Church of England in Bow Brickhill, Buckinghamshire, to the south-east of Milton Keynes.

History
First mentioned in 1185, a major renovation occurred in the 15th century.

It was used at one time as a telegraph station. By 1900, having become greatly dilapidated, the church is said to have been disused for nearly 150 years; but was restored through the munificence and exertions of Browne Willis, the antiquary, who, in 1756, promoted a subscription for that purpose. In 1834, by a re-arrangement of the interior, 175 additional sittings were obtained.

Architecture and fittings
The component parts are a nave with side aisles, and a south porch, a chancel, and a west embattled tower, in which are four bells. The whole is a good specimen of Perpendicular work, without the least mixture of any other style, or the introduction of modern windows; the latter are nearly all square-headed. Three arches on each side divide the nave from the aisles. The central cross beam of the roof bears the date of 1630. There is a piscina in the south aisle. The carved oak pulpit was brought from the old church at Buckingham, upon the erection of the modern edifice. The font is octagonal in form, and on the pedestal supporting it, are four eagles displayed. The compartments are decorated with quatrefoils and foliage; and one of them has a shield with two Roman T's impaled in relievo. The chancel is plain, with open wood ceiling. Beneath the chancel arch is an oak screen. On the north side is a mural tablet of black marble to the memory of the Rev. William Watson.

Parish status
The church is in a joint parish with:
St Mary the Virgin's Church, Great Brickhill 
St Mary Magdalene's Church, Little Brickhill 
St Luke's Church, Stoke Hammond

Organ
The pipe organ was installed by Kirkland. A specification of the organ can be found on the National Pipe Organ Register.

References

External links

}

Bow Brickhill
Bow Brickhill
Churches in Milton Keynes